Vítkovice is an administrative district of the city of Ostrava, capital of the Moravian-Silesian Region in the Czech Republic. Situated on the left bank of the Ostravice River in the Moravian part of the city, Vítkovice was a town in its own right until its incorporation in 1924.

History
The settlement of Witchendorff in the March of Moravia was first mentioned in a 1357 deed by the Lords of Paskov, probably named after the nobleman Witek von Wigstein, who was enfeoffed by the Bishops of Olomouc with nearby Šostýn (Schauenstein) Castle in 1369. In 1435 it was given in pawn with the Lordship of Hukvaldy by Emperor Sigismund to the former Hussite leader Nikolaus Sokol of Lamberg.

Vítkovice, initially agricultural village, witnessed heavy industrialization after 1828, when the Olomouc archbishop Archduke Rudolf of Austria at the instigation of geologist Franz Xaver Riepl had an iron and steel mill (Rudolfshütte) built, the first in the Austrian Empire to use the puddling technique. Since then the village became an important industrial center of the region. 

The iron works were continuously enlarged and finally purchased by the Viennese banker Salomon Mayer von Rothschild in 1843. He also financed the extension of the Emperor Ferdinand Northern Railway from Vienna to Ostrava with a branch-off to his steel mill, which was completed in 1855. His Rothschild heirs in 1873 founded the Witkowitzer Bergbau- und Hüttengewerkschaft, the largest iron and steel works in the Austro-Hungarian Monarchy. During the German occupation of Czechoslovakia their possessions were "aryanized" and taken over by the Reichswerke Hermann Göring conglomerate. At the ironworks, the Germans operated a forced labour "education" camp, and a subcamp of a forced labour "education" camp from Moravská Ostrava. After the war they were socialised as the Vítkovické železárny Klement Gottwald n.p. (VŽKG) by the Czechoslovak state.

Vítkovice from 1850 was an independent municipality. In 1908 it was granted town rights by Emperor Franz Joseph I of Austria, in 1924 it became a part of Greater Ostrava.

Sights

The most important landmarks of Vítkovice are:

Neo-Gothic Saint Paul Church, built in 1880-1886.
Rothschild Palace, built in 1846/47, was an Empire-style building and the palace was the original seat of the owners of the steel works. 
Vítkovice Town Hall, built in 1901/02, has been part of the Vítkovice Iron and Steel Works since 2002 and is designated a National Cultural Landmark.
The FC Vítkovice football club is based in this part of the city. The ice hockey club HC Vítkovice is located nearby but is based in the neighbouring district of Ostrava-Jih, despite its name.

Notable people 
 Ilse Weber (1903-1944), writer, murdered in Auschwitz.
 Leopold Ludwig (1908-1979), conductor
 Beno Blachut (1913-1985), operatic tenor
 Bedřich Geminder, Czechoslovak communist executed during the Slánský show trial
 Nikola Ristanovski, Macedonian actor

Footnotes

References

External links 

  Vítkovice Holding Group

Ostrava
Neighbourhoods in the Czech Republic